The 1914–15 SK Rapid Wien season was the 17th season in club history.

Squad

Squad and statistics

Squad statistics

Fixtures and results

League

References

1914-15 Rapid Wien Season
Rapid